Robert Cairns Craig  (born 16 February 1949) is a Scottish literary scholar, specialising in Scottish and modernist literature. He has been Glucksman Professor of Irish and Scottish Studies at the University of Aberdeen since 2005. Before that, he taught at the University of Edinburgh, serving as head of the English literature department from 1997 to 2003. He was elected a fellow of the British Academy in 2005.

Work
He was awarded a PhD from the University of Edinburgh in 1978 for his thesis W.B. Yeats, T.S. Eliot and the Associationist Aesthetic.

He has published on authors including W. B. Yeats, T. S. Eliot, Ezra Pound, and Iain Banks.

His 1984 book on Yeats, Eliot, and Pound was described by Seamus Deane as lacking a little clarity, panache and focus, but offering an "engrossing" exploration of the relationship between modernism and reactionary politics, which he links via memory, and particularly Archibald Alison's theory of associationism; Deane called it "a complicated story, illustrated by Craig with such well-chosen and well-timed quotations that it is difficult to resist."

In 1991 he wrote "Rooms without a view", an influential article attacking "heritage film".

The Modern Scottish Novel: Narrative and the National Imagination (1999) brought a "modern, inclusive, skeptical intelligence" to the question of Scottish literature.

He was general editor of the four-volume series History of Scottish Literature (published 1987-89).

He has also been involved as editor or publisher with magazines including Cencrastus, Edinburgh Review and Radical Scotland.

Publications
 The Body in the Kit Bag: History and the Scottish Novel, in Cencrastus No. 1, Autumn 1979, pp. 18 – 22, 
 Fearful Selves: Character, Community and the Scottish Imagination, in Cencrastus No. 4, Winter 1980-81, pp. 29 – 32, 
 Going Down to Hell is Easy: Alasdair Gray's 'Lanark''', in Glen Murray (ed.), Cencrastus No. 6, Autumn 1981, pp. 19 - 21, 
 Yeats, Eliot, Pound and the Politics of Poetry (University of Pittsburgh Press, 1982), 
 Peripheries, in Cencrastus No. 9, Summer 1982, pp. 3 - 5, 
 Giving Speech to the Silent, which reviews Continuous: 50 Sonnets from The School of Eloquence by Tony Harrison and From the Domain of Arnheim by Alastair Fowler, in Hearn, Sheila G. (ed.), Cencrastus No. 10, Autumn 1982, pp. 43 & 44, 
 Visitors from the Stars: Scottish Film Culture, in Hearn, Sheila G. (ed.), Cencrastus No. 11, New Year 1983, pp. 6 - 11, 
 An Interview with Kurt Vonnegut in Hearn, Sheila G. (ed.), Cencrastus No. 13, Summer 1983, pp. 29 - 31, 
 Lourd on My Hert, which reviews Chapman 35/36: The State of Scotland - A Predicament for the Scottish Writer?, edited by Joy Hendry; Scotland: The Broken Image by Norman Allan; The State of Scotland: A Poem, by Duncan Glen; and Europa's Lover, by Douglas Dunn, in Hearn, Sheila G. (ed.), Cencrastus No. 15, New Year 1984, pp. 54 & 55, 
 George Orwell and the English Ideology (Part 1), in Hearn, Sheila G. (ed.), Cencrastus No. 16, Spring 1984, pp. 12 - 17, 
 George Orwell and the English Ideology (Part 2), in Parker, Geoff (ed.), Cencrastus No. 17, Summer 1984, pp. 10 - 15, 
 Nation and History, in Parker, Geoff (ed.), Cencrastus No. 19, Winter 1984, pp. 13 - 16, 
 General editor, History of Scottish Literature (1987–89)
 Out of History: Narrative Paradigms in Scottish and English Culture (Polygon,1996), 
 The Modern Scottish Novel: Narrative and the National Imagination (Edinburgh UP, 1999)
 Iain Banks's Complicity: A Reader's Guide (Continuum, 2002)
 Associationism and the Literary Imagination: From the Phantasmal Chaos (2007)
 Intending Scotland: Explorations in Scottish Culture since the Enlightenment (Edinburgh UP, 2009).
 The Wealth of the Nation: Scotland, Culture and Independence (Edinburgh UP, 2018), 

Awards
 2003: Fellow of the Royal Society of Edinburgh (FRSE)
 2005: Fellow of the British Academy (FBA) 
 2007: Officer of the Order of the British Empire (OBE)

Reviews
 Morgan, Edwin (1983), The Politics of Poetry: review of Yeats, Eliot, Pound and the Politics of Poetry, in Hearn, Sheila G. (ed.), Cencrastus'' No. 12, Spring 1983, p. 44,

References

External links
 Cairns Craig's Aberdeen University Page

Scottish scholars and academics
Academics of the University of Aberdeen
Fellows of the British Academy
Fellows of the Royal Society of Edinburgh
Officers of the Order of the British Empire
Scottish literary critics
1949 births
Living people
Scottish literary historians